Relja Dulić Fišer (born 31 December 1975) is a Serbian former professional tennis player.

A left-handed player from Subotica, Dulić Fišer attained a career high singles ranking of 330, competing mostly in ITF Futures/satellite tournaments. He had a poor record in ITF finals, losing 12 in a row at one point during his career. His best performance on the ATP Challenger Tour was a quarter-final appearance at the Brașov Challenger in 2001.

Dulić Fišer was a member of the Yugoslavia Davis Cup team in 2000 and 2001. Appearing in a total of five ties, he won one of his two singles rubbers and was unbeaten in four doubles rubbers, all partnering Janko Tipsarević.

See also
List of Serbia Davis Cup team representatives

References

External links
 
 
 

1975 births
Living people
Serbian male tennis players
Serbia and Montenegro male tennis players
Sportspeople from Subotica